The R558 is a Regional Route in South Africa.

Route
Its northern terminus is the R24 in Krugersdorp. It heads south through Krugersdorp's Kagiso township, crossing the R41 to skirt the western edge of Soweto. It intersects the eastern end of the R559. It intersects the N12 at the point where it ceases to be a highway, and continues south to Lenasia. After passing through Lenasia, it passes through Ennerdale, forming an intersection with the R553, before crossing the N1 highway and ending at a junction with the R557.

References

Regional Routes in Gauteng